Norberto José d'Alva Costa Alegre (born 1951) is a former prime minister of São Tomé and Príncipe. He held the post from 16 May 1992 to 2 July 1994. He is a member of the Democratic Convergence Party-Reflection Group (PCD-GR) and is married to former foreign minister Alda Bandeira.

Political life
In 1990, he ran for the Democratic Convergence Party-Reflection Group (PCD-GR). In the Daniel Daio government, he was finance and economic minister. He became Prime Minister which he held the post from 16 May 1992 until his dismissal by the president on 2 July 1994. He was succeeded by former Defence Minister Evaristo Carvalho. He later ran in parliament for the constituency of Água Grande where the national capital São Tomé is located.

References

External links
History and Election results, archived from the web on 9 May 2008

Living people
1951 births
Democratic Convergence Party (São Tomé and Príncipe) politicians
Government ministers of São Tomé and Príncipe
Finance ministers